Vladislav Borisovich Timakov (20 July 1993 − 6 September 2015) was a water polo player of Russia. He was part of the Russian team at the  2015 World Aquatics Championships.

See also
 Russia at the 2015 World Aquatics Championships

References

Russian male water polo players
1991 births
2015 deaths
Place of birth missing
Universiade medalists in water polo
Universiade silver medalists for Russia
Medalists at the 2013 Summer Universiade